Jean-François Racine (born April 27, 1982) is a Canadian former professional ice hockey goaltender.

Early life
Born in Roxton Falls, Quebec, Canada, Racine played junior hockey for the Drummondville Voltigeurs from 1999 until 2002.

Career 
After his first season of junior, Racine was selected 90th overall by the Toronto Maple Leafs of the National Hockey League (NHL) in the third round of the 2000 NHL Entry Draft. He turned professional with the Memphis RiverKings of the Central Hockey League in the 2002–03 season. In 2003–04, he moved up to the St. John's Maple Leafs of the American Hockey League, the top Maple Leafs affiliate. Racine stayed with the team when the St. John's team moved to Toronto to play for the Toronto Marlies.

Originally sharing the starting role with the Marlies with Tellqvist, the departure of Trevor Kidd as the prime back-up spot on the Leafs earned Tellqvist a promotion, with Racine earning the starting spot. The signing of Jean-Sébastien Aubin to the club, however, led to the two splitting the games 50/50. With the groin injury of Ed Belfour on December 12, 2005, Aubin was recalled to back up Tellqvist. Racine continued with the Marlies until 2007 when he joined Sherbrooke Saint-François of the Ligue Nord-Américaine de Hockey.

References

External links
 

1982 births
Living people
Canadian ice hockey goaltenders
Drummondville Voltigeurs players
Memphis RiverKings players
Toronto Maple Leafs draft picks
Toronto Marlies players
Ice hockey people from Quebec
St. John's Maple Leafs players